Donald Bergagård (born 13 February 1936 in Öckerö) is a Swedish singer, accordionist and evangelist.

In the late 1950s Bergagård was employed as a pastor in the Pentecostal congregation Elim in Örebro. After visiting Aage Samuelsen's Maran Ata meetings in Oslo in 1959, he resolved to spread the movement in Sweden, becoming one of the founders of the Maranata movement there. He founded the first Swedish Maranata congregation in Örebro in 1960.

He was one of the founders of Maran Ata in Oslo, where he was also a pastor from 2001 to 2004. Later that year, he moved to the United States.

Bergagård wrote the Swedish text to the song . The tune was written by Jack & Jim Elsie, under the original title I am going to a city, where the roses never fade.

In March 1963, Bergagård led a Maran Ata meeting in Jönköping where a 13-year-old boy with diabetes was prayed for.  His parents withdrew his insulin shots; the boy died a week later, drawing media attention.

Discography 
 1971 – Vi ska fara bortom månen
 1972 – Jag tänker på staden
 1977 – Gud kan
 1978 – Jesus har berett en himmel
 1982 – Andliga sånger & country
 1983 – Min kung och jag
 1984 – Paradiset väntar
 1985 – Det finns en kärlek
 1988 – Halleluja, Hosianna, Jesus kommer
 1993 – Vid havet av kristall
 1999 – Viloplats i ljusa staden
 2001 – Den Gud som är på höjden, Han är också i dalen

References

External links 
Maran Ata, Oslo

People from Öckerö Municipality
Swedish Pentecostal pastors
1936 births
Living people
21st-century accordionists
21st-century Swedish male singers